Baby Bootlegger is an American wooden-built speedboat. It was designed by George Crouch for Caleb Bragg in early 1924, and was built by Henry Nevins. Bragg won the APBA Gold Cup in it in both 1924 and 1925. It was fitted with a 220-horsepower converted Hispano Suiza aircraft engine dating from the First World War.

References 

Boats
Motorboats